Carl Lundgren was an American baseball and football player and coach.

Carl Lundgren may also refer to:

 Carl Lundgren (illustrator) (born 1947), American fantasy and science fiction illustrator, and fine artist
 Carl A. Lundgren, namesake of Ex parte Lundgren, an ex parte decision by the U.S. Patent and Trademark Office regarding process inventions